Caizi jiaren ( and "scholar and beauty") is a genre of Chinese fiction typically involving a romance between a young scholar and a beautiful girl. They were highly popular during the late Ming dynasty and early Qing dynasty.

History
Three Tang dynasty works particularly influential in the development of the caizi-jiaren model" were Yingying's Biography, The Tale of Li Wa, and Huo Xiaoyu zhuan (T: 霍小玉傳, "The story of Huo Xiaoyu"). Song Geng writes that Iu-Kiao-Li (Yu Jiao Li) was "one of the best-known caizi-jiaren novels". Chloë F. Starr adds that among the best known were Iu-Kiao-Li, Ping Shan Leng Yan, and Haoqiu zhuan.

Elements of this theme are also common in Chinese opera, such as Romance of the Western Chamber, which uses the term caizi jiaren in its text, and The Peony Pavilion. In both of these operas lovers elope, have secret trysts, or were perfect matches in spite of parental disapproval. But the genre finally achieved an independent cultural and historical identity in the early Qing, when a writers began to use the term caizi jiaren for a group of vernacular novels with twenty or so chapters which had formulaic or standard characters and plots. The mid-18th century novel Dream of the Red Chamber criticized them, and literati dismissed them as inferior and obscene. By the 18th century, the genre had developed variety as the scholar and the beauty shared the action with fantasy and various other elements (such as judges and courtroom, monks and nuns, brothels, and illicit assignations, etc.).

Plot characteristics
Hu Wanchuan (T: 胡萬川, S: 胡万川, P: Hú Wànchuān) writes that the typical caizi jiaren plot is a love story between a beautiful girl and a handsome scholar, both of whose families are socially distinguished and both of whom have an aptitude for poetry and prose. Usually each of the protagonists is an only child and oftentimes at least one parent is dead. Song Geng comments that by having one or more of the parents dead, the number of characters is reduced and "this plotline may also serve to emphasize the extraordinary value and peerless perfection of the scholar and beauty".

The story, Hu Wanchuan continues, characteristically opens with an unexpected meeting between the two and love at first sight. The woman often has a female servant who serves as a matchmaker and mediates between the lovers. The plot then deals with obstacles to the marriage; these obstacles often consist of the scholar not having an official rank and the father or mother of the girl opposing the marriage. Often the story ends when the young scholar passes the imperial examinations and the couple is united. Most caizi jiaren stories have happy endings.

Keith McMahon comments that the lovers in caizi jiaren stories of the early Qing  "are like stereotyped opposites of the characters in earlier works". The love of the scholar and the beauty "sharply contrasts" with depictions in late Ming fiction, where love is erotic rather than spiritual. In the caizi jiaren novel "sentiment replaces libido" and "refined, internal feelings replace vulgar, external sensations".

One characteristic of the early Qing works is the mutual respect between the sexes. The men do not condescend to the women, and in many cases the talented and independent young woman is the equal of her male lover. Since she is often an only child who has been cherished and educated by her father as if she were a boy, she skillfully helps her father and lover out of difficulty. She sometimes even dresses as a male. One beauty states her motto as "though in body I am a woman, in ambition I surpass men" and one father says of such a daughter that she is worth ten sons. Their roles and personalities are so similar that in many instances the woman dresses as a man. Yet the relation is not entirely equal. To dress as a male, for instance, represents upward mobility, but there are only few instances of men dressing as women except to seduce women or to seek homosexual encounters. Nor is there necessarily equality in the number of partners, since in a number of later novels the man takes more than one wife or has a series of lovers. In the end, what the beauty wants is to choose a man who is worthy of her.

Characters
In addition to physical beauty, the two main characters both (especially the girl) also possess many other positive characteristics, such as literary talent, noble birth, virtue, and chastity. The preface of Iu-kiao-li: or, the Two Fair Cousins (Yu Jiao Li) states that "The young man is as beautiful as the girl while the girl is as brilliant as the young man".

Pseudo-caizi, who pretend to be caizi, are foils to the real caizi in caizi jiaren stories.

Influence
Song wrote that while Dream of the Red Chamber (Honglou meng) "cannot be regarded as a caizi-jiaren novel as such, there is little controversy about the influence of the caizi-jiaren characterization and theme on it". Robert E. Hegel in his review of The Chinese Novel at the Turn of the Century, wrote that Jean Duval's description of The Nine-tailed Turtle "makes the novel seem indebted to Haoqiu zhuan 好逑傳 and perhaps other works of the earlier caizi jiaren romantic tradition".  Hegel elsewhere that The Carnal Prayer Mat (Rou putuan) was intended to satirize the imperial examination system and parody the patterns in caizi jiaren novels.

Reception
Starr wrote that the novels of the genre "encountered a critical silence similar to that occluding red-light novels, though for apparently more 'objective' aesthetic reasons, after the genre was dismissed for its lack of imagination".

References
 Hegel, Robert E. "The Chinese Novel at the Turn of the Century" (book review). Chinese Literature: Essays, Articles, Reviews (CLEAR), ISSN 0161-9705, 07/1983, Volume 5, Issue 1/2, pp. 188–191 
 Huang, Martin W. Desire and Fictional Narrative in Late Imperial China (Volume 202 of Harvard East Asian monographs, ISSN 0073-0483). Harvard University Asia Center, 2001. , 9780674005136.
 
 
 Song, Geng. The Fragile Scholar: Power and Masculinity in Chinese Culture. Hong Kong University Press, January 1, 2004. , 9789622096202.
 Starr, Chloë F. Red-Light Novels of the Late Qing (Volume 14 of China Studies). Brill, 2007. , 9789004156296.

Notes

Further reading

 Crawford, William Bruce. "The Oil vender and the courtesan" and the Ts'ai-tzu Chia-jen novels. - See Google Books profile
 Su, Jianxin. The Evolution of Chinese Caizi-Jiaren Novels, Social Sciences Academic Press, 2006.
 Zhou, Jianyu. The Caizi-jiaren Novel: A Historical Study of a Genre of Chinese Narrative from the Seventeenth Century to the Nineteenth Century. Princeton University, 1995. - See Google Books profile and Google Books Profile #2
 Caizi jiaren xiaoshuo shulin (Volume 2 of Ming Qing xiaoshuo luncong). Chunfeng wenyi, 1985. - See Google Books profile
 Xu, Longfei (Advisor: Guo Yingde). "Research on Caizi-Jiaren Literature of Late Ming and Early Qing Dynasty" (PhD thesis dissertation) Beijing Normal University, 2008.

Chinese literature
Chinese literary genres